Here is a detailed discography for American country music artist Roy Clark.

Studio albums

1960s

1970s

1980s–1990s

Instrumental albums

Live albums

Compilation albums

Singles

1950s–1960s

1970s

1980s

Charted B-sides

Notes

A ^ Yesterday, When I Was Young peaked at number 35 on the RPM Top Albums chart in Canada.
B ^ My Music peaked at number 22 on the RPM Country Albums chart in Canada.

References

Clark, Roy
Discographies of American artists